Kyrgyzstan participated in the 2014 Asian Games in Incheon, South Korea from 19 September to 4 October 2014.

Medal summary

Medalists

Archery

Men's recurve

Women's recurve

Athletics

Men's

Women

Boxing

Men

Canoeing

Slalom
Men

Sprint
Men

Women

Cycling

Road
Men

Fencing

Men

Football

Men

Golf

Men

Gymnastics

Rhythmic gymnastics

Individual Qualification

Individual all-around

Judo

Men

Women

Karate

Men's kumite

Women's kumite

Modern pentathlon

Men

Women

Shooting

Men

Women

Swimming

Women

Taekwondo

Men

Tennis

Men

Women

Mixed Doubles

Weightlifting

Men

Women

Wrestling

Men's freestyle

Men's Greco-Roman

Women's freestyle

Wushu

Men's sanda

Men's taolu

Women's sanda

References

Nations at the 2014 Asian Games
2014
Asian Games